Marcus Vinicius Carvalho Lopes D'Almeida (born January 30, 1998 in Rio de Janeiro), known as Marcus D'Almeida, is a Brazilian athlete who competes in recurve archery. World runner-up in 2021. In June 2022 he reached 4th place in the world ranking.

Career 

D'Almeida first competed internationally in 2013, and in 2014 won three gold medals at the South American Games (where he broke all South American records for 1440 Rounds) and qualified for the 2014 Archery World Cup Final as the second highest qualifier, where he won a silver medal, losing to Brady Ellison in the final by shoot-off.
 His spectacular rise to the upper echelons of the sport while still a teenager has earned him the nickname, "Archery's Neymar".

He won a silver medal in the individual competition at the 2014 Summer Youth Olympics, in Nanjing, China, where he was the flagbearer for Brazil.

At the 2019 Pan American Games, he won the silver medal, losing only to Canadian Crispin Duenas, bronze medalist at the 2013 World Archery Championships, for a tight 6x4 score.

At the Olympic Games in Tokyo 2020, by beating Dutchman Sjef van den Berg and advancing to the round of 16, he obtained the best result of a Brazilian archer in the history of archery in the Olympics. He was eliminated in the round of 16 by Italian Mauro Nespoli, who finished with Olympic silver in this competition. Nespoli hit all the arrows in the most central part of the target (always getting 9 or 10 points).

In September 2021 he won the first medal in Brazil's history at the World Archery Championships. He won the silver medal, in a competition that featured all the medalists of the Tokyo Olympics.

In June 2022, he reached the 4th place in the world ranking after the title at the World Cup in Paris, where he defeated three Olympic champions, two of them South Koreans.

References

External links
 
 
 

1998 births
Living people
Brazilian male archers
Sportspeople from Rio de Janeiro (city)
Archers at the 2015 Pan American Games
Archers at the 2019 Pan American Games
Pan American Games silver medalists for Brazil
Pan American Games bronze medalists for Brazil
Archers at the 2014 Summer Youth Olympics
World Archery Championships medalists
Olympic archers of Brazil
Archers at the 2016 Summer Olympics
Pan American Games medalists in archery
South American Games gold medalists for Brazil
South American Games medalists in archery
Competitors at the 2014 South American Games
Medalists at the 2019 Pan American Games
Medalists at the 2015 Pan American Games
Archers at the 2020 Summer Olympics
20th-century Brazilian people
21st-century Brazilian people